Frederick II, Frederik II or Friedrich II may refer to:

 Frederick II, Holy Roman Emperor (1194–1250), King of Sicily from 1198; Holy Roman Emperor from 1220
 Frederick II of Denmark (1534–1588), king of Denmark and Norway 1559–1588
 Frederick II of Prussia (1712–1786), king 1740–1786, better known as Frederick the Great
 Frederick II, Grand Duke of Baden (1857–1928)
 Frederick II, Elector of Saxony (1412–1464)
 Frederick II, Elector of Brandenburg (1413–1471), margrave 1440–1470
 Frederick II, Elector Palatine (1482–1556), elector 1544–1556
 Frederick II (Archbishop of Cologne) (1120–1158)
 Frederick II, Duke of Upper Lorraine (995–1026), count of Bar and duke of Lorraine, co-reigning with his father from 1019
 Frederick II, Duke of Swabia (1090–1147)
 Frederick II, Duke of Lorraine (died 1213)
 Frederick II, Duke of Austria (died 1246), Duke of Austria 1230–1246
 Frederick II, Duke of Brunswick-Lüneburg (1418–1478)
 Frederick II, Duke of Holstein-Gottorp (1568–1587)
 Frederick II, Duke of Saxe-Gotha-Altenburg (1676–1732)
 Frederick II, Duke of Mecklenburg-Schwerin (1717–1785), called the Pious
 Friedrich II, Duke of Anhalt (1856–1918)
 Frederik II van Sierck (died 1322), bishop of Utrecht
 Frederick II, Margrave of Baden-Eberstein (died 1333)
 Frederick II, Margrave of Meissen (1310–1349)
 Frederick II, Marquess of Saluzzo (died 1396)
 Frederick II, Landgrave of Hesse-Homburg (1633–1708), hero of Heinrich von Kleist's play Der Prinz von Homburg
 Frederick II, Landgrave of Hesse-Kassel (1720–1785)
 Frederick II, Count of Diessen (1030–1075), bailiff of Regensburg cathedral
 Frederick II, Count of Celje (1379–1454), Ban of Croatia, Slavonia and Dalmatia
 Frederick II, Count of Vaudémont (1420s–1470), Lord of Joinville
 Frederick the Second, 1927 biography of Frederick II, Holy Roman Emperor, by Ernst Kantorowicz

See also  
 Frederik II Upper Secondary School in Fredrikstad, Norway, named for Frederick II of Denmark
 Frederick III of Sicily (1272–1337), the second Frederick to rule the kingdom
 Frederick Augustus II of Saxony (1797–1854), king of Saxony 1836–1854
 Frederick William II (disambiguation)